Kolah Deraz-e Sofla (also Romanized as Kolāh Derāz-e Soflá; also known as Kolāh Derāz-e Āqājān) is a village in Cheleh Rural District, in the Central District of Gilan-e Gharb County, Kermanshah Province, Iran. At the 2006 census, its population was 649, in 141 families.

References 

Populated places in Gilan-e Gharb County